Loxopholis caparensis is a species of lizard in the family Gymnophthalmidae. It is found in Venezuela and Colombia.

References

Loxopholis
Reptiles described in 2005
Taxa named by Luis Felipe Esqueda